Pope Gregory VII (1015 – 25 May 1085), born Hildebrand of Sovana, was head of the Catholic Church and ruler of the Papal States from 22 April 1073 to his death in 1085. He is venerated as a saint in the Catholic Church.

One of the great reforming popes, he is perhaps best known for the part he played in the Investiture Controversy, his dispute with Emperor Henry IV that affirmed the primacy of papal authority and the new canon law governing the election of the pope by the College of Cardinals. He was also at the forefront of developments in the relationship between the emperor and the papacy during the years before he became pope. He was the first pope in several centuries to rigorously enforce the Western Church's ancient policy of celibacy for the clergy and also attacked the practice of simony.

Gregory VII excommunicated Henry IV three times. Consequently, Henry IV would appoint Antipope Clement III to oppose him in the political power struggles between the Catholic Church and his empire. Hailed as one of the greatest of the Roman pontiffs after his reforms proved successful, Gregory VII was, during his own reign, despised by some for his expansive use of papal powers.

Because this pope was such a prominent champion of papal supremacy, his memory was evoked on many occasions in later generations, both positively and negatively, often reflecting later writers' attitude to the Catholic Church and the papacy. Beno of Santi Martino e Silvestro, who opposed Gregory VII in the Investiture Controversy, leveled against him charges such as necromancy, torture of a former friend upon a bed of nails, commissioning an attempted assassination, executions without trials, unjust excommunication, doubting the Real Presence of the Eucharist, and even burning the Eucharist. This was eagerly repeated by later opponents of the Catholic Church, such as the English Protestant John Foxe. In contrast, the modern historian of the 11th century H. E. J. Cowdrey writes, "[Gregory VII] was surprisingly flexible, feeling his way and therefore perplexing both rigorous collaborators ... and cautious and steady-minded ones ... His zeal, moral force, and religious conviction, however, ensured that he should retain to a remarkable degree the loyalty and service of a wide variety of men and women."

Early life
Gregory was born as Ildebrando di Sovana in Sovana, in the county of Grosseto, now southern Tuscany, central Italy. The historian Johann Georg Estor made the claim that he was the son of a blacksmith. As a youth he was sent to study in Rome at the monastery of St. Mary on the Aventine, where, according to some unconfirmed sources, his uncle was abbot of a monastery on the Aventine Hill. Among his masters were the erudite Lawrence, archbishop of Amalfi, and Johannes Gratianus, the future Pope Gregory VI. When the latter was deposed by Holy Roman Emperor Henry III and exiled to Germany, Hildebrand followed him to Cologne.

According to some chroniclers, Hildebrand moved to Cluny after Gregory VI's death, which occurred in 1048; though his declaration to have become a monk at Cluny must not be taken literally. He then accompanied Abbot Bruno of Toul to Rome; there, Bruno was elected pope, choosing the name Leo IX, and named Hildebrand as deacon and papal administrator. In 1054 Leo sent Hildebrand as his legate to Tours in France in the wake of the controversy created by Berengar of Tours. At Leo's death, the new pope, Victor II, confirmed him as legate, while Victor's successor Stephen IX sent him and Anselm of Lucca to Germany to obtain recognition from Empress Agnes. Stephen died before being able to return to Rome, but Hildebrand was successful; he was then instrumental in overcoming the crisis caused by the Roman aristocracy's election of an antipope, Benedict X, who, thanks also to Agnes's support, was replaced by the Bishop of Florence, Nicholas II. With the help of 300 Norman knights sent by Richard of Aversa, Hildebrand personally led the conquest of the castle of Galeria Antica where Benedict had taken refuge. Between 1058 and 1059, he was made archdeacon of the Roman church, becoming the most important figure in the papal administration.

He was again the most powerful figure behind the election of Anselm of Lucca the Elder as Pope Alexander II in the papal election of October 1061. The new pope put forward the reform program devised by Hildebrand and his followers. In his years as papal advisor, Hildebrand had an important role in the reconciliation with the Norman kingdom of southern Italy, in the anti-German alliance with the Pataria movement in northern Italy and, above all, in the introduction of a law which gave the cardinals exclusive rights concerning the election of a new pope.

Election to the papacy

Pope Gregory VII was one of the few popes elected by acclamation. On the death of Alexander II on 21 April 1073, as the obsequies were being performed in the Lateran Basilica, there arose a loud outcry from the clergy and people: "Let Hildebrand be pope!", "Blessed Peter has chosen Hildebrand the Archdeacon!" Hildebrand immediately fled, and hid himself for some time, thereby making it clear that he had refused the uncanonical election in the Liberian Basilica. He was finally found at the Church of San Pietro in Vincoli, to which a famous monastery was attached, and elected pope by the assembled cardinals, with the due consent of the Roman clergy, amid the repeated acclamations of the people.

It was debated at the time—and remains debated by historians—whether this extraordinary outburst in favour of Hildebrand by clergy and people was wholly spontaneous or could have been the result of some pre-concerted arrangements. According to Benizo, Bishop of Sutri, a supporter of Hildebrand, the outcry was begun by the actions of Cardinal Ugo Candidus, Cardinal Priest of S. Clemente, who rushed into a pulpit and began to declaim to the people. Certainly, the mode of his election was highly criticized by his opponents. Many of the charges brought may have been expressions of personal dislike, liable to suspicion from the very fact that they were not raised to attack his promotion until several years later. But it is clear from Gregory's own account of the circumstances of his election, in his Epistle 1 and Epistle 2, that it was conducted in a very irregular fashion. First of all, it was contrary to the Constitution of the Pope promulgated and approved in the Roman Synod of 607, which forbade a papal election to begin until the third day after a pope's burial. Cardinal Ugo's intervention was contrary to the Constitution of Nicholas II, which affirmed the exclusive right to name candidates to the Cardinal Bishops; finally, the requirement of Pope Nicholas II that the Holy Roman Emperor be consulted in the matter was ignored. However, what ultimately turned the tide in favor of validity of Gregory VII's election was the second election at S. Pietro in Vincoli and the acceptance by the Roman people.

Gregory VII's earliest pontifical letters clearly acknowledge this fact, and thus helped defuse any doubt about his election as immensely popular. On 22 May 1073, the Feast of Pentecost, he received ordination as a priest, and he was consecrated a bishop and enthroned as pope on 29 June (the Feast of St. Peter's Chair).

In the decree of election, those who had chosen him as Bishop of Rome proclaimed Gregory VII "a devout man, a man mighty in human and divine knowledge, a distinguished lover of equity and justice, a man firm in adversity and temperate in prosperity, a man, according to the saying of the Apostle, of good behavior, blameless, modest, sober, chaste, given to hospitality, and one that ruleth well his own house; a man from his childhood generously brought up in the bosom of this Mother Church, and for the merit of his life already raised to the archidiaconal dignity". "We choose then", they said to the people, "our Archdeacon Hildebrand to be pope and successor to the Apostle, and to bear henceforward and forever the name of Gregory" (22 April 1073).

Gregory VII's first attempts in foreign policy were towards a reconciliation with the Normans of Robert Guiscard; in the end the two parties did not meet. After a failed call for a crusade to the princes of northern Europe, and after obtaining the support of other Norman princes such as Landulf VI of Benevento and Richard I of Capua, Gregory VII was able to excommunicate Robert in 1074. In the same year Gregory VII summoned a council in the Lateran palace, which condemned simony and confirmed celibacy for the Church's clergy. These decrees were further stressed, under menace of excommunication, the next year (24–28 February). In particular, Gregory decreed in this second council that only the Pope could appoint or depose bishops or move them from see to see, an act which was later to cause the Investiture Controversy.

Start of conflict with the Emperor

The main focus of the ecclesiastico-political projects of Gregory VII is to be found in his relationship with the Holy Roman Empire. Since the death of Holy Roman Emperor Henry III, the strength of the German monarchy had been seriously weakened, and his son Henry IV had to contend with great internal difficulties. This state of affairs was of material assistance to Gregory VII. His advantage was further enhanced by the fact that in 1073 Henry IV was only twenty-three years of age.

In the two years following the election of Gregory VII, Henry was forced by the Saxon Rebellion to come to amicable terms with him at any cost. Consequently, in May 1074 he did penance at Nuremberg—in the presence of the papal legates—to atone for his continued friendship with the members of his council who had been banned by Gregory, took an oath of obedience, and promised his support in the work of reforming the Church. This attitude, however, which at first won him the confidence of the pope, was abandoned as soon as he defeated the Saxons at the First Battle of Langensalza on 9 June 1075 (also called the Battle of Homburg or Battle of Hohenburg). Henry then tried to reassert his rights as the sovereign of northern Italy without delay. He sent Count Eberhard to Lombardy to combat the Patarenes; nominated the cleric Tedald to the archbishopric of Milan, thus settling a prolonged and contentious question; and finally tried to establish relations with the Norman duke Robert Guiscard.

Gregory VII replied with a rough letter, dated 8 December 1075, in which, among other charges, he accused Henry of breaching his word and with his continued support of excommunicated councillors. At the same time, he sent a verbal message suggesting that the enormous crimes which would be laid to his account rendered him liable, not only to the ban of the Church, but to the deprivation of his crown. Gregory did this at a time when he himself was confronted by a reckless opponent in the person of Cencio I Frangipane, who on Christmas night surprised him in church and carried him off as a prisoner, though on the following day Gregory was released.

Pope and emperor depose each other
The reprimands of the Pope, couched as they were in such an unprecedented form, infuriated Henry and his court, and their answer was the hastily convened national council in Worms, Germany (the synod of Worms), which met on 24 January 1076. In the higher ranks of the German clergy Gregory had many enemies, and a Roman cardinal, Hugo Candidus, once on intimate terms with him but now his opponent, had hurried to Germany for the occasion. All the accusations with regard to Gregory that Candidus could come up with were well received by the assembly, which committed itself to the resolution that Gregory had forfeited the papacy. In one document full of accusations, the bishops renounced their allegiance to Gregory. In another, Henry pronounced him deposed, and the Romans were required to choose a new pope.

The council sent two bishops to Italy, and they procured a similar act of deposition from the Lombard bishops at the synod of Piacenza. Roland of Parma informed the pope of these decisions, and he was fortunate enough to gain an opportunity for speech in the synod, which had just assembled in the Lateran Basilica, to deliver his message there announcing the dethronement. For the moment the members were frightened, but soon such a storm of indignation was aroused that it was only due to the moderation of Gregory himself that the envoy was not murdered.

On the following day, 22 February 1076, Pope Gregory VII pronounced a sentence of excommunication against Henry IV with all due solemnity, divested him of his royal dignity and absolved his subjects from the oaths they had sworn to him. This sentence purported to eject a ruler from the Church and to strip him of his crown. Whether it would produce this effect, or would be an idle threat, depended not so much on Gregory VII as on Henry's subjects, and, above all, on the German princes. Contemporary evidence suggests that the excommunication of Henry made a profound impression both in Germany and Italy.

Thirty years before, Henry III had deposed three claimants to the papacy, and thereby rendered an acknowledged service to the Church. When Henry IV tried to copy this procedure he was less successful, as he lacked the support of the people. In Germany there was a rapid and general feeling in favor of Gregory, and the princes took the opportunity to carry out their anti-regal policy under the cloak of respect for the papal decision. When at Whitsun the king proposed to discuss the measures to be taken against Gregory VII in a council of his nobles, only a few made their appearance; the Saxons snatched at the golden opportunity for renewing their rebellion, and the anti-royalist party grew in strength from month to month.

Walk to Canossa

The situation now became extremely critical for Henry. As a result of the agitation, which was zealously fostered by the papal legate Bishop Altmann of Passau, the princes met in October at Trebur to elect a new German ruler. Henry, who was stationed at Oppenheim on the left bank of the Rhine, was only saved from the loss of his throne by the failure of the assembled princes to agree on the question of his successor.

Their dissension, however, merely induced them to postpone the verdict. Henry, they declared, must make reparation to Gregory VII and pledge himself to obedience; and they decided that, if, on the anniversary of his excommunication, he still lay under the ban, the throne should be considered vacant. At the same time they decided to invite Gregory VII to Augsburg to decide the conflict.

These arrangements showed Henry the course to be pursued. It was imperative under any circumstances and at any price to secure his absolution from Gregory before the period named, otherwise he could scarcely foil his opponents in their intention to pursue their attack against him and justify their measures by an appeal to his excommunication. At first he attempted to attain his ends by an embassy, but when Gregory rejected his overtures he took the celebrated step of going to Italy in person.

Gregory VII had already left Rome and had intimated to the German princes that he would expect their escort for his journey on 8 January 1077 to Mantua. But this escort had not appeared when he received the news of Henry's arrival. Henry, who had travelled through Burgundy, had been greeted with enthusiasm by the Lombards, but resisted the temptation to employ force against Gregory. He chose the unexpected course of forcing Gregory to grant him absolution by doing penance before him at Canossa, where Gregory had taken refuge under the protection of his close ally, Matilda of Tuscany. The Walk to Canossa soon became legendary.

The reconciliation was only effected after prolonged negotiations and definite pledges on the part of Henry, and it was with reluctance that Gregory VII at length gave way, considering the political implications. If Gregory VII granted absolution, the diet of princes in Augsburg in which he might reasonably hope to act as arbitrator would either become useless, or, if it met at all, would change completely in character. It was impossible, however, to deny the penitent re-entrance into the Church, and Gregory VII's religious obligations overrode his political interests.

The removal of the ban did not imply a genuine reconciliation, and no basis was gained for a settlement of the main question that divided Henry and Gregory: that of investiture. A new conflict was inevitable from the very fact that Henry considered the sentence of deposition repealed along with that of excommunication. Gregory, on the other hand, was intent on reserving his freedom of action and gave no hint on the subject at Canossa.

Later excommunications of Henry IV
That the excommunication of Henry IV was simply a pretext for the opposition of the rebellious German nobles is transparent. Not only did they persist in their policy after his absolution, but they took the more decided step of setting up a rival ruler in the person of Duke Rudolf of Swabia at Forchheim in March 1077. At the election, the papal legates present observed the appearance of neutrality, and Gregory VII himself sought to maintain this attitude during the following years. His task was made easier in that the two parties were of fairly equal strength, each trying to gain the upper hand by getting the pope on their side. But the result of his non-committal policy was that he largely lost the confidence of both parties. Finally he decided for Rudolf of Swabia after his victory at the Battle of Flarchheim on 27 January 1080. Under pressure from the Saxons, and misinformed as to the significance of this battle, Gregory abandoned his waiting policy and again pronounced the excommunication and deposition of King Henry on 7 March 1080.

But the papal censure now proved a very different thing from the one four years before. It was widely felt to be an injustice, and people began to ask whether an excommunication pronounced on frivolous grounds was entitled to respect. The king, now more experienced, took up the struggle with great vigour. He refused to acknowledge the ban on the ground of its illegality. He then summoned a council that met at Brixen, and on 25 June pronounced Gregory deposed. It nominated the archbishop Guibert (Wibert) of Ravenna as his successor. On 25 June 1080, Guibert was elected Pope by the thirty bishops who were present at the King's command. On 15 October 1080, Pope Gregory advised the clergy and laity to elect a new archbishop in place of the "mad" and "tyrannical" schismatic Wibert. In 1081, Henry opened the conflict against Gregory in Italy. Gregory's support had by that time weakened, and thirteen cardinals had deserted him. To make matters worse, Rudolf of Swabia died on 16 October of the same year. Henry was now in a stronger position and Gregory a weaker one. A new claimant, Hermann of Luxembourg, was put forward in August 1081, but his personality was not suitable for a leader of the Gregorian party in Germany, and the power of Henry IV was at its peak.

The pope's chief military supporter, Matilda of Tuscany, blocked Henry's armies from the western passages over the Apennines, so he had to approach Rome from Ravenna. Rome surrendered to the German king in 1084, and Gregory thereupon retired into the exile of the Castel Sant'Angelo. Gregory refused to entertain Henry's overtures, although the latter promised to hand over Guibert as a prisoner, if the sovereign pontiff would only consent to crown him emperor. Gregory, however, insisted as a necessary preliminary that Henry should appear before a Council and do penance. The emperor, while pretending to submit to these terms, tried hard to prevent the meeting of the bishops. A small number assembled nonetheless, and, in accordance with their wishes, Gregory again excommunicated Henry.

Henry, upon receipt of this news, again entered Rome on 21 March to see that his supporter, Archbishop Guibert of Ravenna, was enthroned as Pope Clement III on 24 March 1084. Henry was crowned emperor by his creature, but Robert Guiscard, with whom in the meantime Gregory had formed an alliance, was already marching on the city. Henry was compelled to flee towards Civita Castellana.

Exile from Rome
The pope was liberated, but after the Roman people became incensed by the excesses of his Norman allies, he was compelled to withdraw to Monte Cassino, and later to the castle of Salerno by the sea, where he died on 25 May 1085. Three days before his death, he withdrew all the censures of excommunication that he had pronounced, except those against the two chief offenders—Henry and Guibert.

Papal policy to the rest of Europe

England

In 1076, Gregory appointed Dol Euen, a monk of Saint-Melaine of Rennes, as bishop of Dol, rejecting both the incumbent, Iuthael, who had the support of William the Conqueror, who had recently been conducting military operations in north-eastern Brittany, and Gilduin, the candidate of the nobles in Dol opposing William. Gregory rejected Iuthael because he was notorious for simony and Guilden as too young. Gregory also bestowed on Dol Euen the pallium of a metropolitan archbishop, on the condition that he would submit to the judgment of the Holy See when the long-standing case of the right of Dol to be a metropolitan and use the pallium was finally decided.

King William felt himself so safe that he interfered autocratically with the management of the church, forbade the bishops to visit Rome, made appointments to bishoprics and abbeys, and showed little anxiety when the pope lectured him on the different principles which he had as to the relationship of spiritual and temporal powers, or when he prohibited him from commerce or commanded him to acknowledge himself a vassal of the apostolic chair. William was particularly annoyed at Gregory's insistence on dividing ecclesiastical England into two provinces, in opposition to William's need to emphasize the unity of his newly acquired kingdom. Gregory's increasing insistence on church independence from secular authority in the matter of clerical appointments became a more and more contentious issue. He sought as well to compel the episcopacy to look to Rome for validation and direction, demanding the regular attendance of prelates in Rome. Gregory had no power to compel the English king to an alteration in his ecclesiastical policy, so he was compelled to ignore what he could not approve, and even considered it advisable to assure King William of his particular affection. On the whole, William's policy was of great benefit to the Church.

Normans in the Kingdom of Sicily
The relationship of Gregory VII to other European states was strongly influenced by his German policy, since the Holy Roman Empire, by taking up most of his energies, often forced him to show to other rulers the very moderation which he withheld from the German king. The attitude of the Normans brought him a rude awakening. The great concessions made to them under Nicholas II were not only powerless to stem their advance into central Italy, but failed to secure even the expected protection for the papacy. When Gregory VII was hard pressed by Henry IV, Robert Guiscard left him to his fate, and only intervened when he himself was threatened with German arms. Then, on the capture of Rome, he abandoned the city to his troops, and the popular indignation evoked by his act brought about Gregory's exile.

Claims of Papal sovereignty
In the case of several countries, Gregory VII tried to establish a claim of sovereignty on the part of the Papacy, and to secure the recognition of its self-asserted rights of possession. On the ground of "immemorial usage", Corsica and Sardinia were assumed to belong to the Roman Church. Spain, Hungary and Croatia were also claimed as her property, and an attempt was made to induce the king of Denmark to hold his realm as a fief from the pope.

In his treatment of ecclesiastical policy and ecclesiastical reform, Gregory did not stand alone, but found powerful support: in England Archbishop Lanfranc of Canterbury stood closest to him; in France his champion was Bishop Hugh de Dié, who afterwards became Archbishop of Lyon.

France
Philip I of France, by his practice of simony and the violence of his proceedings against the Church, provoked a threat of summary measures. Excommunication, deposition and the interdict appeared to be imminent in 1074. Gregory, however, refrained from translating his threats into actions, although the attitude of the king showed no change, for he wished to avoid a dispersion of his strength in the conflict soon to break out in Germany.

Pope Gregory attempted to organize a crusade into Al-Andalus, led by Count Ebles II of Roucy.

Distant Christian countries
Gregory, in fact, established some sort of relations with every country in Christendom; though these relations did not invariably realize the ecclesiastico-political hopes connected with them. His correspondence extended to Poland, Kievan Rus' and Bohemia. He unsuccessfully tried to bring Armenia into closer contact with Rome.

Byzantine Empire
Gregory was particularly concerned with the East. The schism between Rome and the Byzantine Empire was a severe blow to him, and he worked hard to restore the former amicable relationship. Gregory successfully tried to get in touch with the emperor Michael VII. When the news of the Muslim attacks on the Christians in the East filtered through to Rome, and the political embarrassments of the Byzantine emperor increased, he conceived the project of a great military expedition and exhorted the faithful to participate in recovering the Church of the Holy Sepulchre—foreshadowing the First Crusade. In his efforts to recruit for the expedition, he emphasized the suffering of eastern Christians, arguing western Christians had a moral obligation to go to their aid.

Internal policy and reforms

His lifework was based on his conviction that the Church was founded by God and entrusted with the task of embracing all mankind in a single society in which divine will is the only law; that, in its capacity as a divine institution, it is supreme over all human structures, especially the secular state; and that the pope, in his role as head of the Church, is the vice-regent of God on earth, so that disobedience to him implies disobedience to God: or, in other words, a defection from Christianity. But any attempt to interpret this in terms of action would have bound the Church to annihilate not merely a single state, but all states.

Thus Gregory VII, as a politician wanting to achieve some result, was driven in practice to adopt a different standpoint. He acknowledged the existence of the state as a dispensation of providence, described the coexistence of church and state as a divine ordinance, and emphasized the necessity of union between the sacerdotium and the imperium. But at no period would he have dreamed of putting the two powers on an equal footing; the superiority of church to state was to him a fact which admitted of no discussion and which he had never doubted.

He wished to see all important matters of dispute referred to Rome; appeals were to be addressed to himself; the centralization of ecclesiastical government in Rome naturally involved a curtailment of the powers of bishops. Since these refused to submit voluntarily and tried to assert their traditional independence, his papacy is full of struggles against the higher ranks of the clergy. Pope Gregory VII was critical in promoting and regulating the concept of modern university as his 1079 Papal Decree ordered the regulated establishment of cathedral schools that transformed themselves into the first European universities.

This battle for the foundation of papal supremacy is connected with his championship of compulsory celibacy among the clergy and his attack on simony. Gregory VII did not introduce the celibacy of the priesthood into the Church, but he took up the struggle with greater energy than his predecessors. In 1074, he published an encyclical, absolving the people from their obedience to bishops who allowed married priests. The next year he enjoined them to take action against married priests, and deprived these clerics of their revenues. Both the campaign against priestly marriage and that against simony provoked widespread resistance.

His writings treat mainly of the principles and practice of Church government. They may be found in Mansi's collection under the title "Gregorii VII registri sive epistolarum libri". Most of his surviving letters are preserved in his Register, which is now stored in the Vatican Archives.

Doctrine of the Eucharist
Gregory VII was seen by Pope Paul VI as instrumental in affirming the tenet that Christ is present in the Blessed Sacrament. Gregory's demand that Berengarius perform a confession of this belief was quoted in Pope Paul VI's historic 1965 encyclical Mysterium fidei:

This profession of faith began a "Eucharistic Renaissance" in the churches of Europe as of the 12th century.

Death
Pope Gregory VII died in exile in Salerno; the epitaph on his sarcophagus in the city's Cathedral says: "I have loved justice and hated iniquity; therefore, I die in exile."

Legacy
Gregory VII was beatified by Pope Gregory XIII in 1584 and canonized on 24 May 1728 by Pope Benedict XIII.

See also

 Concordat of Worms
 Dictatus papae (1075–87)
 First Council of the Lateran
 Libertas ecclesiae
 List of popes

References

Further reading
 
 Paul von Bernried, Canon of Regensburg, "S. Gregorii VII Vita," J. P. Migne (ed.), Patrologiae Cursus Completus Series Latina Tomus CXLVIII: Sancti Gregorii VII Epistolae et Diplomata Pontificia (Paris 1878), 39–104.
 Bonizo of Sutri, "Liber ad amicum", in Philippus Jaffé (editor) Bibliotheca rerum Germanicarum Tomus II: Monumenta Gregoriana (Berolini 1865), pp. 577–689. 
 
 
 
 
 Kuttner, S. (1947). 'Liber Canonicus: a note on the Dictatus Papae', Studi Gregoriani 2 (1947), 387–401.
 Capitani, O. "Esiste un' «età gregoriana» ? Considerazioni sulle tendenze di una storiografia medievistica," Rivista di storia e letteratura religiosa 1 (1965), pp. 454–481.
 Capitani, O. (1966). Immunità vescovili ed ecclesiologia in età "pregregoriana" e "gregoriana". L'avvio alla "Restaurazione, Spoleto. 
 
 Gatto, L. (1968). Bonizo di Sutri ed il suo Liber ad Amicum Pescara. 
 Knox, Ronald (1972). "Finding the Law: Developments in Canon Law during the Gregorian Reform," Studi Gregoriani 9 (1972) 419–466.
 Gilchrist, J. T. (1972). "The Reception of Pope Gregory VII into the Canon Law (1073–1141)." Zeitschrift für Rechtsgeschichte: Kanonistische Abteilung, 59 (1973), 35–82.
 Capitani, O. (1984). L'Italia medievale nei secoli di trapasso: la riforma della Chiesa (1012–1122). Bologna.
 Fuhrmann, H. (1989). "Papst Gregor VII. und das Kirchenrecht. Zum Problem des Dictatus papae," Studi Gregoriani XIII, pp. 123–149, 281–320.
 Golinelli, Paolo (1991). Matilde e i Canossa nel cuore del Medioevo. Milano: Mursia.
 
 Capitani, Ovidio (2000), "Gregorio VII, santo," in Enciclopedia dei Papi. Roma: Istituto della Enciclopedia italiana.
 
 . Monumenta Germaniae Historica. Studien und Texte, 53. 
 Capitani, Ovidio; (ed. Pio Berardo) (2015). Gregorio VII : il papa epitome della chiesa di Roma. Spoleto : Centro Italiano di Studi sull'Alto Medioevo.
 
 Villegas-Aristizábal, Lucas, "Pope Gregory VII and Count Eblous II of Roucy's Proto-Crusade in Iberia c. 1073", Medieval History Journal 21.1 (2018), 1–24.

External links

 Women's Biography: Matilda of Tuscany, countess of Tuscany, duchess of Lorraine, contains several of his letters to his supporter, Matilda of Tuscany.
 Database of the Letters of Pope Gregory VII: Which letter is in which collection?
 
 
 

 
1010s births
1085 deaths
People from Sorano
Cluniacs
Diplomats of the Holy See
Benedictine popes
Italian popes
Investiture Controversy
11th-century popes
Burials at Salerno Cathedral
Clerical celibacy
Medieval Italian saints
Papal saints
11th-century Christian saints
Benedictine saints
Sovana
Canonizations by Pope Benedict XIII